Tobias Nygård Vibe (born 19 August 1990) is a Norwegian professional footballer who plays for Alta, as a defender.

References

1990 births
Living people
Norwegian footballers
FK Senja players
IL Hødd players
Tromsdalen UIL players
HIFK Fotboll players
Alta IF players
Norwegian First Division players
Veikkausliiga players
Norwegian Second Division players
Association football defenders
Norwegian expatriate footballers
Norwegian expatriate sportspeople in Finland
Expatriate footballers in Finland
People from Lødingen
Sportspeople from Nordland